Arvorezinha is a municipality in the state of Rio Grande do Sul, Brazil.

History
The municipality's first inhabitant was Lino Figueira, who settled in the region c. 1900. Much of the incoming population were Italian immigrants from the nearby cities of Antônio Prado, Veranópolis, Bento Gonçalves, Caxias do Sul and Garibaldi, who started settling during the early 20th century. Before its establishment as a municipality, which was official as of February 16, 1959, the land belonged to Taquari and later Encantado.

See also
List of municipalities in Rio Grande do Sul

References

Municipalities in Rio Grande do Sul